Robert Price Higgins (October 8, 1932December 18, 2022) was an American systematic invertebrate zoologist and ecologist, specializing in the unusual taxa of kinorhynchs and tardigrades.

Early life and education
Robert P. Higgins was born on 8 Oct 1932 in Denver, Colorado to Jay Higgins and Amy E (Gates) Higgins,  and he attended South High School in Denver, graduating in 1950.  He attended the University of Colorado where he earned both his bachelor's and master's degrees studying in the laboratory of invertebrate zoologist Robert William Pennak, and on the advice of Pennak, he attended Duke University, as a James W. Duke Fellow, earning his Ph.D. in 1961.

Career 
In 1961, Higgins started his career in academia as a faculty member in the Biology Department at Wake Forest University, and in 1968 he had a one-year post-doctoral research position at the Marine Biological Laboratory in the Systematics-Ecology program.  In 1969, he joined  the Smithsonian Institution in the as a biological oceanographer. Higgins served as Director of the Centre for Mediterranean Marine Classification 1969–1971, Program Director of Limnology and Oceanography, 1971–1974, acting director, International Programme on Environmental Sciences in 1974, Zoologist Superior from 1974 to 1978, and Curator, Department of Invertebrate Zoology, National Museum of Natural History in 1978. Higgins retired from the Smithsonian Institution in 1996.

Death 
Higgins died at the age of 90 on December 18, 2022, in Asheville, North Carolina.

Selected publications 
  1959: Life history of Macrobiotus islandicus Richters with notes on other tardigrades from Colorado. Transactions of the American Microscopical Society 78(2):137-154. https://doi.org/10.2307/3224022
  1967: The revival of Macrobiotus areolatus Murray (Tardigrada) from the Cryptobiotic State. Crowe, J.H., & Higgins, R.P.  1967.  Transactions of the American Microscopical Society 86(3):286-294. 
  1975: Occurrence of the genus Tanarctus Renaud-Debyser, 1959 in Northeastern Atlantic waters with a description of T. ramazzotti n. sp. (Arthrotardigrada).
 1983: The Atlantic barrier reef ecosystem at Carrie Bow Cay, Belize, II: Kinorhyncha.
  1984: A New Family of Arthrotardigrada (Tardigrada: Heterotardigrada) from the Atlantic Coast of Florida, U.S.A.
  1986: New Loricifera from southeastern United States coastal Waters.
 1988: Introduction to the Study of Meiofauna.

Taxa and species described by Higgins 
Cryptorhagina Higgins, 1968
Condyloderes Higgins, 1969
Dracoderidae Higgins & Shirayama, 1990
Dracoderes Higgins & Shirayama, 1990
Nanaloricus gwenae Kristensen, Heiner & Higgins, 2007
Neocentrophyes Higgins, 1969
Neocentrophyidae Higgins, 1969
Paracentrophyes Higgins, 1983
Pliciloricidae Higgins & Kristensen, 1986
Pliciloricus dubius Higgins & Kristensen, 1986
Pliciloricus enigmaticus Higgins & Kristensen, 1986
Pliciloricus gracilis Higgins & Kristensen, 1986
Pliciloricus orphanus Higgins & Kristensen, 1986
Pliciloricus profundus Higgins & Kristensen, 1986
Pliciloricus Higgins & Kristensen, 1986
Rugiloricus carolinensis Higgins & Kristensen, 1986
Rugiloricus cauliculus Higgins & Kristensen, 1986
Rugiloricus ornatus Higgins & Kristensen, 1986
Rugiloricus Higgins & Kristensen, 1986
Sphenoderes Higgins, 1969
Sphenoderes indicus Higgins, 1969
Zelinkaderes Higgins, 1990
Zelinkaderidae Higgins, 1990

Taxa described in honor of Higgins 
Parastygarctus higginsi Renaud-Debyser, 1965
Halicaris higginsi Newell, 1984  
Echinoderes higginsi Huys & Coomans, 1989
Araphura higginsi Sieg & Dojiri, 1989
Halicryptus higginsi Shirley & Storch, 1999
Ptychostomella higginsi Clausen, 2004
Fissuroderes higginsi Neuhaus & Blasche, 2006
Typhlamphiascus higginsi Chullasorn 2009
Isoechiniscoides higginsi (Hallas & Kristensen, 1982)

References 

1932 births
Smithsonian Institution people
People from Denver
University of Colorado alumni
Duke University alumni
Wake Forest University faculty
American ecologists
Living people
20th-century biologists
Fellows of the American Association for the Advancement of Science